The Skowkale First Nation or Skowkale Band is a band government of the Sto:lo people located in the Upper Fraser Valley region, near Sardis, part of Chilliwack, British Columbia, Canada.  They are a member government of the Sto:lo Nation tribal council.

References

Sto:lo governments
First Nations governments in the Lower Mainland
Politics of Chilliwack